Steven Joseph La Torre (born Stefano La Torre; ; March 12, 1886 – July 5, 1984) was an Italian-American crime boss of the Bufalino crime family. He founded what would become the Bufalino crime family, which he ran from 1903 to 1908. La Torre died on July 5, 1984.

Early life
La Torre was born on March 12, 1886, in Montedoro, Sicily, to Giuseppe La Torre and Maria Marranca. He entered the United States in May 1903, settling in Pittston, Pennsylvania. He set up a criminal empire in Pittston-Scranton-Wilkes-barre areas of Pennsylvania. La Torre paid for the passage of Mafia boss Santo Volpe to Pennsylvania in 1906. They formed "the men from Montedoro". In April 1907, La Torre was arrested with Santo Volpe, Charles Bufalino, uncle of future crime boss Russell Bufalino, and twenty other men for a protection racket against mine workers in the region.

La Torre married Rose Lucchino, and had two sons, Joseph and Samuel, who both became Federal Bureau of Investigation informants; and two daughters, Mary and Lena.

Criminal career
In 1908, La Torre stepped down as boss of Pittston, but remained connected to the Mafia. Volpe became the new crime boss. In 1955, La Torre was called to a meeting with Joe Barbara where he refused to have a possible rat in the Pittston crime organization killed. Barbara became angry with La Torre and reduced his influence in the Mafia. La Torre remained a consultant to Russell Bufalino until his death in 1984.

Death
La Torre died of natural causes on July 5, 1984, at the age of 98. He is buried in Memorial Shrine Cemetery, Carverton, Pennsylvania.

References

 

1886 births
1984 deaths
American crime bosses
American gangsters of Sicilian descent
Bufalino crime family
Burials in Pennsylvania
Criminals from Pennsylvania
Italian emigrants to the United States
People from Montedoro
People from Pittston, Pennsylvania
Gangsters from the Province of Caltanissetta